Ivan Redkach (born 11 March 1986) is a Ukrainian professional boxer.

Professional career
On 7 January 2011 Redkach fought and beat Jaime Orrantia by third-round knockout in Fairfield, California.

On 1 June 2019, he scored one of the biggest wins of his career, over former world champion Devon Alexander. In the sixth round, Redkach connected with a left-hand to floor Alexander for the first time in the bout. He managed to drop Alexander two more times in the round, with the third knockdown also being the last of the fight, forcing the referee to stop the fight.

In his next fight, he faced another former world champion in Danny García. The fight didn't include a lot of action, however, despite that García looked like the clear winner, hurting Redkach late in the fifth, and cutting him in the seventh round. During the eighth round, Redkach bit García on the shoulder while allegedly saying "Mike Tyson" to García during the process. The judges awarded García a unanimous decision victory, scoring the fight 118–110, 117–111 and 117–111 in favor of the former champion.

Following his fight against Garcia, Redkach took on Regis Prograis on April 17, 2021 in Atlanta. In the sixth round, Prograis landed a glancing blow to Redkach’s kidney area. Redkach responded by dropping to the canvas holding his groin as if Prograis had hit him below the belt. The fight was stopped due to the punch, and because the ruling by referee Jim Morb was that it was due to an accidental low blow, a technical decision was rendered and Prograis was declared the winner. Prograis protested the decision, saying that he knocked out Redkach, and after an appeal the decision was changed from a technical decision to a technical knockout defeat for Redkach.

Professional boxing record

References

External links
 
 Ivan Redkach - Profile, News Archive & Current Rankings at Box.Live
 Official telegram Group

1986 births
Lightweight boxers
Living people
Ukrainian male boxers
People from Shostka
Ukrainian expatriate sportspeople in the United States
Sportspeople from Sumy Oblast